No Plan B may refer to:

 No Plan B (EP), a 2007 EP by Group 1 Crew
 No Plan B (band), a band headed by The Who's Roger Daltrey
 No Plan B (album), an album by Carman
 No Plan B, an album by 4th Avenue Jones
 "No Plan B", a song by Manafest from The Chase
Also
 Born to Sing: No Plan B a 2012 album by Van Morrison